Imerco is a Danish chain of 155 independent homeware shops.

History
Imerco was founded in 1928. In 2007, M. Goldschmidt Capital acquired an 82 & shares of the company. In August 2016, it was announced that Imerco will merge with the competing homeware chain Inspiration.

Organisation
As of 2016, Imerco consisted of 155 independent homeware shops. The company also has a web store and a customer club with more than one million members. Frederik Brønnum took over the position as CEO in 2+13.
 
M. Goldschmidt Capital owns 84 & of the company. On the completion of the merger with Inspiration, M. Goldschmidt Capital will own 65 % and  Niels Thorborg-owned 3C Retail will own 28 %.

Products
Imerco owns the brands Cook & Baker, CASA and Erik Bagger.

References

External links
 Official website

Retail companies of Denmark
Retail companies based in Copenhagen
Companies based in Herlev Municipality
Retail companies established in 1928
Danish companies established in 1928